Eastcliff is a 20-room house overlooking the Mississippi River in St. Paul, Minnesota, United States, which serves as the official residence of the president of the University of Minnesota system.  It was first built in 1922 by local lumber magnate Edward Brooks Sr. and donated to the university by the Brooks family in 1958, beginning its service as the president's official residence in 1960 when O. Meredith Wilson took the position.  In 2000, the home was added to the National Register of Historic Places.  Today, it is the most-visited public residence in the state (outpacing the Minnesota Governor's Residence), often hosting events five days a week.  6,800 people were recorded attending 159 events in 2005.

The building was designed in the Georgian colonial style by Clarence H. Johnston Sr., a close friend of Brooks and an architect who had designed many buildings at the university to fit a master plan by Cass Gilbert.  Numerous renovations took place over the years, though repair efforts did not keep pace with wear and tear.  In 1988, extensive repairs began on the house, but unforeseen problems caused costs to double.  The ensuing outcry contributed to the exit of president Kenneth Keller from office.

The following is a list of university presidents who have resided at Eastcliff:
O. Meredith Wilson
Malcolm Moos
C. Peter Magrath
Kenneth Keller
Nils Hasselmo
Mark Yudof
Robert H. Bruininks
Eric W. Kaler
Joan T.A. Gabel

See also
 List of university and college presidents' houses in the United States
 National Register of Historic Places listings in Ramsey County, Minnesota

References

External links
University of Minnesota: Eastcliff
The Minnesota Daily: In Eastcliff mansion, Kalers share space with public
MPR News: This old University of Minnesota house: a peek inside Eastcliff
Minnpost: With new U president installed, time for Eastcliff FAQ

Colonial Revival architecture in Minnesota
Houses completed in 1922
Houses in Saint Paul, Minnesota
Houses on the National Register of Historic Places in Minnesota
National Register of Historic Places in Saint Paul, Minnesota
University and college buildings on the National Register of Historic Places in Minnesota
University of Minnesota